Ky Willott (born 15 March 2001) is a field hockey player from Australia, who plays as a midfielder.

Personal life
Ky Willott was born and raised in Lake Macquarie, New South Wales.

Career

Domestic league
Willott is a member of the NSW Pride in Australia's national league, the Sultana Bran Hockey One. He made his debut in the inaugural season of the league.

Following his 2019 debut, appeared in season two in 2022.

Kookaburras
In 2022, Willott was named in the Kookaburras for the first time. In April of that year, he made his senior international debut in a test series against Malaysia in Perth.

References

External links
 
 

2001 births
Living people
Australian male field hockey players
Male field hockey midfielders